Autosticha triangulimaculella is a moth in the family Autostichidae. It was described by Aristide Caradja in 1928. It is found in China.

References

Moths described in 1928
Autosticha
Moths of Asia